In mathematics, Dini's criterion is a condition for the pointwise convergence of Fourier series, introduced by .

Statement

References

Fourier series